William Creed Wampler III (born March 11, 1991) is an American attorney and politician from Abingdon, Virginia.

After defeating Russell County supervisor David Eaton in the Republican primary, Wampler defeated Starla Kiser in the 2019 general election to succeed Todd Pillion in the Virginia House of Delegates. He is the grandson of Congressman William Wampler and son of state senator William Wampler Jr.

Electoral history

References

External links
 Campaign website

Living people
Politicians from Abingdon, Virginia
Republican Party members of the Virginia House of Delegates
21st-century American politicians
1991 births
University of South Carolina alumni
Liberty University School of Law alumni